The Yangon Region Transport Authority (YRTA) is the operating transit agency for Yangon Region, Myanmar. It was formed on 8 July 2016. YRTA currently operates Yangon Bus Service, which began operations on 15 January 2017.

References

2016 establishments in Myanmar
Transport organisations based in Myanmar
Transport authorities
Organizations established in 2016